The 1942 Invercargill mayoral by-election was held on 22 June 1942 to elect the Mayor of Invercargill after the resignation of John Robert Martin due to illness on 26 May.

Background
Abraham Wachner was elected to council in 1938 and became deputy mayor in 1941.

Results
The following table gives the election results:

References

1942 elections in New Zealand
Mayoral elections in Invercargill